The .303 Savage is a rimmed, .30 caliber rifle cartridge developed by the Savage Arms Company in 1894 which was designed as a short (as short as the .30-30 Winchester) action cartridge for their Savage Model 1895 later 1899 hammerless lever-action rifle. The cartridge was designed for smokeless powder at a time when black-powder cartridges were still popular. The .303 Savage round  was ballistically superior to the .30-30, but only marginally. The .303 Savage remained popular through the 1930s. Savage produced a half dozen loads for it. With its 190-grain loading, it was used on such animals as deer and moose.

The .303 Savage and the .303 British cartridge are not interchangeable with each other. Neither the bullet diameter nor the cartridge dimensions are compatible.

History
Savage Arms created the .303 Savage as part of an unsuccessful attempt at creating a cartridge for the military. Although the cartridge was never popular with the military, it did become a popular round for civilian hunters. Initially designed round-nosed but becoming a pointed-tip rimmed cartridge in early 1900s, it worked well in the Model 99 rifles that Savage produced because of their rotary magazine. It wasn't as successful in other lever-action rifles because only the round-nose loading were safe to use with their tubular magazines. However, the pointed-tip bullets gave it a ballistic advantage over other traditional lever-action cartridges such as the .30-30 Winchester.

Reloading
The .303 Savage has a small, but loyal fraternity of shooters who reload this cartridge. While major ammunition manufacturers have long since halted production of ammo, dedicated followers can procure loaded ammunition and brass cases through smaller enterprises. The brass cases can be formed from .30-30 Winchester,  .32 Winchester Special,  and .38-55 Winchester casings, if no correct brass is available.  Great care must be taken as the Winchester brass is about .020” smaller at the base and case failure is possible. It is safer to obtain correct .303 Savage brass, which shows up occasionally in runs from Norma or Prvi Partizan.

Loads respond well to traditional loads in the same range as the .30-30 or .30 Remington. However, the slightly larger case volume, and stronger rifle action allow for loads that improve significantly over standard loads for the .30-30. It is quite possible to put 190 grain flat points at 2200fps as well as 160 grain FTX bullets at 2400 fps, even from 20” featherweight barrels.

References

External links
 Savage 99 Web site
 Load Data 303 Savage
 The Savage Model 99 by Jon Y Wolfe at Chuck Hawks

Pistol and rifle cartridges
Rimmed cartridges
Savage Arms